Kavakdere Dam is a dam in Izmir Province, Turkey, built between 1994 and

2002. The development was backed by the Turkish State Hydraulic Works.

See also
List of dams and reservoirs in Turkey

References

DSI directory, State Hydraulic Works (Turkey), Retrieved December 16, 2009

Dams in Edirne Province